Four new parishes were created in Cornwall, England, United Kingdom for the St Austell area on 1 April 2009. The parishes are:
 St Austell Town Council covering Bethel, Gover, Mount Charles, Poltair and St Austell Bay (Holmbush area); represented by 20 councillors.
 Carlyon Parish Council covering Carlyon Bay and Tregrehan; represented by 9 councillors.
 St Austell Bay Parish Council covering Charlestown, Duporth, Porthpean and Trenarren; represented by 7 councillors.
 Pentewan Valley Parish Council covering Tregorrick, Trewhiddle, London Apprentice and Pentewan; represented by 9 councillors.

References

 Cornwall Council website General Information on Parish and Town Councils. retrieved May 2010

Civil parishes in Cornwall
St Austell